Stumai Abdalla  is a  Tanzanian footballer who plays as a forward  for  the Tanzanian women's national team. In 2019 she was the captain of the national team when they were defending their CECAFA Women's Championship trophy.

References

Living people
Tanzanian women's footballers
Women's association football midfielders
Tanzania women's international footballers
Year of birth missing (living people)